Selbach is a municipality in the district of Altenkirchen, in Rhineland-Palatinate, in western Germany.

The place gave its name to Selbach, Rio Grande do Sul in southern Brazil, where since the pioneering days the Riograndenser Hunsrückisch language, a Brazilian variety of German largely based on the Rhine Franconian is spoken.

References

Altenkirchen (district)